Cyclocheilichthys janthochir is a species of freshwater fish in the family Cyprinidae. It is known from the Kapuas River in West Kalimantan, Borneo (Indonesia).

Cyclocheilichthys janthochir feeds on aquatic insects. It grows to  total length.

References

janthochir
Freshwater fish of Indonesia
Endemic fauna of Borneo
Endemic fauna of Indonesia
Fish described in 1854